Runway 34 is a 2022 Indian Hindi-language thriller film produced and directed by Ajay Devgn under the Ajay Devgn FFilms banner. The film is inspired by an aviation incident of a Jet Airways flight 9W-555 from Dubai to Kochi on August 18, 2015. The film stars Ajay Devgn, Amitabh Bachchan, and Rakul Preet Singh, with Boman Irani, Angira Dhar and Aakanksha Singh playing pivotal roles.

Runway 34 was released theatrically on 29 April 2022. It received mixed to positive reviews, but underperformed at the box office. It was released for digital streaming on Amazon Prime Video on 24 June 2022.

Plot

Captain Vikrant Khanna is an accomplished pilot, who is preparing for a flight from Dubai to Cochin. He parties before the flight, and feels tired on boarding it, where his co-pilot is Tanya Albuquerque. Later, a cyclone in Cochin leads to the flight being diverted to Trivandrum on Khanna's suggestion, despite objection from Albuquerque. Albuquerque says that Bengaluru has to be the second option, not Trivandrum, as the latter is near Cochin and has a high chance of having bad weather too. Khanna says that if they divert to Trivandrum, they can attempt a landing there and save fuel. Due to miscommunication, the pilots do not realize that Trivandrum is facing weather worse than Cochin, which reduces the visibility level. Captain Khanna manages to land the flight while closing his eyes, and averts a major disaster. 

Prior to an enquiry, a small interrogation takes place, including Khanna's medical test. The instrument, however, is damaged and isn't able to reveal whether or not Khanna is drunk. The enquiry is held regarding the pilots' actions, headed by AAIB Head Narayan Vedant. The enquiry is held mainly because Alma Asthana, an elderly woman who was on the flight and was the sole passenger to trust Khanna with his decision to divert to Trivandrum, had died of a heart attack on her way to the hospital. During the enquiry, a polygraph is conducted on Khanna. Vedant scares Albuquerque with his questions and she mistakenly reveals that Khanna had closed his eyes during landing. 

During the next session of the enquiry, Khanna reveals that he has a photographic memory, so he knew what he was doing during landing, even though his eyes were closed as he was imagining everything in his mind. He eventually proves it through a simulated flight with Vedant as his co-pilot. He makes the same movements that he did on the night of the landing, this time wearing an eye cap over his eyes, to assure Vedant that he can land flights without seeing. He is suspended for three months, but is praised for his skill.

Cast 
 Ajay Devgn as Captain Vikrant Khanna, The captain of Skyline 777
 Amitabh Bachchan as Narayan Vedant, Head of AAIB
 Rakul Preet Singh as First Officer Tanya Albuquerque, Vikrant's co-pilot
 Boman Irani as Nishant Suri, owner of the Skyline Airway company
 Ajay Shankar as Lijesh Joseph
 Angira Dhar as Radhika Roy, Vikrant's lawyer
 Aakanksha Singh as Samaira Khanna, Vikrant's wife
 Vijay Nikam as Santoshlal Tripathi, Employee at Cochin ATC
 Aamil Keeyan Khan as Vikram Sukumaran, ATC Trivandrum
 Flora Jacob as Alma Asthana, the old lady who dies
 Rukhsana as Delilah Asthana
 Al-Mamun Al Siyam as Lumin
 Hrishikesh Pandey as Yusuf Rangoonwala, Head of Pilot's Union
 Rakesh Bhavsar as Ramiz
 CarryMinati as himself

Production

Development 
The film was originally titled Mayday. In November 2021, the name of the upcoming film was changed to Runway 34. The number "34" in the film's title was chosen because that was Ajay's age when his daughter Nysa was born. The film is based on true events, in which a plane from Doha to Kochi landed with only a very small amount of fuel left.

Filming 
The official announcement of the film was made on 7 November 2020 and principal photography began on 11 December 2020 in Hyderabad. It is filmed at Hyderabad and Mumbai. The filming halted for sometime due to lockdown, COVID restrictions in 2021. In August 2021, Devgn travelled to Russia to do recce and finalise locations to film the scenes, reportedly later in September
Ajay Devgn, Rakul Preet and Boman Irani travelled to Russia to film some airport scenes. The film was wrapped on 17 December 2021.

Release 
The film was released theatrically on 29 April 2022, coinciding with the festival of Eid. It was released on Amazon Prime Video on 24 June 2022.

Reception

Box office 
Runway 34 earned 3 crore at the domestic box office on its opening day. On the second day, the film collected 4.50 crore. On the third day, the film collected 5.50 crore, taking total domestic weekend collection to 13 crore.

 the film grossed  crore in India and  crore overseas for a worldwide gross collection of  crore. The film fell short of break-even by almost 20 crore, making it a commercial failure.

Critical response 
Runway 34 received mixed to positive reviews from critics.

Rachana Dubey of The Times Of India gave the film a rating of 4/5 and wrote "Runway 34 should be experienced for the way it depicts one of the scariest, and a near-disastrous aviation mishap in recent times with engaging characters, thrill and drama". Shweta Keshri of India Today gave the film a rating of 3.5/5 and wrote "With Runway 34, Ajay Devgn finally finds his tongue as a director, and two atrocious prior attempts". Rohit Bhatnagar of The Free Press Journal gave the film a rating of 3.5/5 and wrote "With Runway 34, Ajay Devgn surely found his space that is rich in thrill". Nandini Ramnath of Scroll.in gave the film a rating of 3.5/5 and wrote "Runway 34 is evenly balanced between offenders and the offended before it goes on the defensive". A Reviewer from DNA India gave the film a rating of 3.5/5 and wrote "Runway 34 is a balanced film, with right amount of technical, emotional and masala content". Taran Adarsh from Bollywood Hungama gave the film a rating of 3/5 and wrote "Despite a gripping first half, the slow moving and conversation heavy second half limit the Ajay Devgn – Amitabh Bachchan starrer Rumway 34 a bit". Saibal Chatterjee of NDTV gave the film a rating of 3/5 and wrote "Ajay Devgn, with a consistent performance that never goes off the radar, powers Runway 34. Rakul Preet Singh gives a solid account of herself. As for Amitabh Bachchan and other actors, the path is riddled with air pockets caused by blurry writing".

Shilajit Mitra of Cinema Express gave the film a rating of 3/5 and wrote "Runway 34 is a frequently tense, perfectly serviceable aviation thriller, a genre of questionable repute in Hindi cinema". Sukanya Verma of Rediff gave the film a rating of 2.5/5 and wrote "Runway 34 is a clumsy cocktail of Hollywood movies spiked with the Bollywood brand of God complex". Sanjana Jadhav of Pinkvilla gave the film a rating of 2.5/5 and wrote "Runway 34 can be a one-time watch but there are better aviation dramas you may want to explore". Shubhra Gupta of The Indian Express gave the film a rating of 2.5/5 and wrote "Ajay Devgn manages to deliver a somewhat effective pre interval portion despite its inelegant, underlined bits, but the film plummets as the curse of second half hits". Navneet Vyasan of News 18 gave the film a rating of 2.5/5 and wrote "Good VFX but Ajay Devgn's character feels cliched, Amitabh Bachchan holds together the enquiry scenes".

Anna M. M. Vetticad of Firstpost gave the film a rating of 2.5/5 and wrote "Runway 34 is unmemorable because it lacks a sense of urgency even while recounting a life-and-death story.". Monika Rawal Kukreja of The Hindustan Times stated "The Ajay Devgn directorial, which stars himself, Amitabh Bachchan, and Rakul Preet Singh is an edgy, fast-paced aviation drama that ends up being a great big screen cinematic experience".

Music 

The film's music composed by Jasleen Royal while lyrics written by Aditya Sharma.

References

External links 
 
 Runway 34 at Bollywood Hungama

2020s Hindi-language films
Ajay Devgn
Films shot in Russia
Indian aviation films
Indian thriller films
2022 thriller films